Sri, SRI, or variations thereof, may refer to:

Sri
Sri or similar may refer to:

 Dewi Sri, ancient Javanese and Balinese goddess
 Lakshmi, the Hindu goddess of wealth
 Shree ragam, a Carnatic musical scale
 Shri (musician), Shrikanth Sriram, UK
 Shri (dinosaur), a genus of dsomaeusaurid dinosaur
 Sri or Sri Sri, a Hindu honorific
 Sri (1999 film), Indonesia
 Sri (2005 film), India
 Sri (actor), Indian film actor
 Sri Kommineni, a South Indian music director
 Sri Lanka, an island nation in South Asia
 Sri Sri (writer), Srirangam Srinivasarao

SRI
SRI may refer to:
 Sacrum Romanum Imperium, the former Holy Roman Empire 
 Samarinda or Temindung Airport, former IATA code
 The Steam Railroading Institute, Owosso, MI, US
 Selection Research, Inc., acquired by the Gallup Organization in 1988
 Serikat Rakyat Independen, Union of (Indonesian) Independent People Party
 Serotonin reuptake inhibitor
 Serviciul Român de Informaţii, the Romanian domestic intelligence service
 Siena Research Institute
 Socially responsible investing
 Socorro Rojo Internacional
 Solar Reflectance Index of a roof as a reflective surface
 SRI (gene)
 SRI International, formerly Stanford Research Institute
 SRi, a car model used for several General Motors vehicles
 Smart Readiness Indicator
 Subresource Integrity of a website
 Sumitomo Rubber Industries, a global tire and rubber company
 Sunnybrook Research Institute in health sciences, Toronto, Canada
 Swiss Radio International
 System of Rice Intensification, to increase yield
 Sarekat Rakjat Indonesia, former Surinamese political party

See also

 
 

 Sri Sri (disambiguation)
 Shree (disambiguation)
 Selective serotonin reuptake inhibitor (SSRI)
 SRIS